The 2018 Michigan Attorney General election took place on November 6, 2018, alongside elections to elect Michigan's governor, Class I United States Senator, Secretary of State, as well elections for Michigan's 14 seats in the United States House of Representatives, all 38 seats in the Michigan Senate and all 110 seats in the Michigan House of Representatives; to elect the Secretary of State of Michigan. Incumbent Republican Attorney General Bill Schuette was prohibited from seeking a third term due to term limits and unsuccessfully ran for Governor of Michigan instead. The Michigan GOP was unsuccessful in looking to win its 5th straight attorney general election. Along with the offices of Lieutenant Governor and Secretary of State, the nominees for attorney general were chosen by party delegates at their respective party conventions.

Nessel defeated Leonard by 115,000 votes, becoming the first Democratic attorney general of Michigan since 2003, when Jennifer Granholm left office to become governor.

Republican Party

Candidates

Nominee
 Tom Leonard, speaker of the Michigan House of Representatives

Declared
 Tonya Schuitmaker, state senator

Declined
 Mary Beth Kelly, former Associate Justice of the Michigan Supreme Court (2011–2015)

Democratic Party

Candidates

Nominee
 Dana Nessel, civil rights attorney

Declared
 Patrick Miles Jr., former United States Attorney for the Western District of Michigan (2012–2017)
 William Noakes, former Wayne County Deputy Corporation Counsel

Declined
 Steve Bieda, state senator (running for Congress)
 Tim Greimel, state representative and former minority leader of the Michigan House of Representatives (running for Congress)
 Eric Smith, Macomb County Prosecutor

General election

Polling

Fundraising

Results

Notes

References

External links
Official campaign websites
Tom Leonard (R) for Attorney General
Dana Nessel (D) for Attorney General

Attorney General
Michigan Attorney General elections
Michigan Attorney General election
Michigan